The 1946 Los Angeles Rams season was the team's ninth year with the National Football League and the first season in Los Angeles. The team moved to Los Angeles from Cleveland immediately after winning the 1945 NFL Championship Game.

The 1946 team is best remembered for its inclusion of two African-American players, halfback Kenny Washington and end Woody Strode – the first in the NFL since the 1933 season. The team finished with a record of 6-4-1, good for second place in the NFL's Western Conference.

Narrative

Relocation to Los Angeles

The 1946 season marked the first time that the National Football League's Cleveland Rams played their games in the booming Southern California city of Los Angeles. Cleveland had won the 1945 NFL Championship Game by a 15-14 score over the Washington Redskins in December 1945 and immediately pursued plans to relocate to the greener pastures of the Pacific coast.

On January 15, 1946, Rams team representatives went before the Los Angeles Coliseum Commission with a plan to lease use of the facility for home games – the bowl then currently being used for home games played by UCLA and the University of Southern California. The Commission had previously been made aware that the Los Angeles Dons of the forthcoming All-America Football Conference would be seeking similar accommodation. On January 23, the Coliseum Commission approved use of the stadium for five Rams Sunday home games during the 1946 season. An additional exhibition game with the team's 1945 Championship opponents, the Redskins, was scheduled for the preseason.

With access to the 103,000 seat Los Angeles Memorial Coliseum assured, speculation immediately began about the team's drawing potential, with former collegiate coach Chick Meehan opining his belief that the Rams in their new Los Angeles venue would outdraw all other teams in the league with the exception of the New York Giants. A mere 32,178 fans had braved the elements to attend the 1945 Championship Game hosted by Cleveland.

Role in NFL integration

When the Cleveland Rams moved to Los Angeles, the team sought to play in the publicly owned Los Angeles Memorial Coliseum— a decision which created immediate pressure that the team be racially integrated, since black taxpayers as well as white had paid for construction of the facility. As a result, the team signed African-American free agent Kenny Washington, formerly of the Hollywood Bears of the Pacific Coast Professional Football League, on March 21, 1946.

Washington, winner of the 1939 Douglas Fairbanks Trophy as the outstanding player in college football, thus became the first African-American player of the modern era to sign a contract to play in the NFL. The last previous black player in the league had been Joe Lillard, formerly of the University of Oregon, who played for the Chicago Cardinals in 1932 and 1933.

The Rams also signed a second black player, fellow UCLA alumnus and Hollywood Bears teammate Woody Strode on May 7, 1946. The Rams were joined as trailblazers in the integration process by the ownership of the All-America Football Conference's Cleveland Browns, which also signed two black players for the 1946 season, Marion Motley and Bill Willis.

Roster development

The anchor of the team remained the quarterback who had captained the Rams to the 1945 World Championship as the league's Rookie of the Year, Bob Waterfield. A California native like Washington and Strod, the future Hall of Famer Waterfield would lead the NFL in attempts, completions, and passing TDs in 1946, going 127-for-251 (50.6%) with 17 touchdown strikes.

Waterfield's success throwing the ball was tempered by his propensity to throw interceptions, however, as he equalled his league-leading 17 interceptions thrown in 1945 in the 1946 campaign. Waterfield also handled punting and kicking duties for the team, kicking a league-leading 31 extra point in 1946 and averaging 40.6 yards per punt, with a season-long of 68 yards. In Waterfield the Rams' front office felt they had a field leader with a proven record of success.

In addition to a willingness to take a chance by toppling the NFL's 13-year ban on signing black athletes, Rams general manager Chile Walsh was aggressive in pursuing big name talent to flesh out the team's roster to make Rams games into compelling events. On July 20, 1946, Walsh executed a trade with the Chicago Bears, sending off halfback Dante Magnani and tackle Fred Davis to obtain the rights to two-time All-American and 1940 Heisman Trophy winner Tom Harmon, a 26-year-old who had served as a bomber pilot during World War II rather than playing ball for a service team. Already a Southern California resident with an actress for a wife, the league's number one overall pick of the 1941 NFL draft, seemed a natural fit for Los Angeles' newest sports entertainment company. For his own part, Bears boss George Halas was anxious to obtain Magnani, who had led the Bears in rushing in 1943.

Harmon would prove to be a bust for the team, however, only starting 3 games in the 1946 season and gaining a mere 236 yards – 84 of those on one play, in what would be the longest run from scrimmage in the NFL during the 1946 season. He would, however, also gain nearly 200 yards via the pass and score a total of 4 offensive touchdowns in what would be the best season of his two-year NFL career. Harmon proved more successful as a defender, picking off three balls, including one interception run back 85 yards for a touchdown in the 1946 season.

With team revenue tied largely to local ticket sales during this era of professional football, the Rams placed an emphasis upon accumulating West Coast players. Former Southern Californian collegiate stars Waterfield, Washington, Harmon, and Strode were joined on the roster by Pat West, Bob de Lauer, Jim Hardy, Bob Hoffman, and Jack Banta of USC; lineman Elbie Schultz of Oregon State; center Roger Harding of Cal; Charles Ferrero of UC Santa Barbara, and Glen Conley of the University of Washington.

NFL Draft

As NFL champions the Rams drafted last out of the league's 10 teams in the 1946 NFL Draft. They were also one of the five teams skipped in rounds 2 and 4 in an additional effort to build parity between poor and strong finishers – receiving instead low value compensatory picks in the 31st and 32nd rounds.

The Rams used 6 of their top 17 picks to select players from Notre Dame University, perhaps not coincidentally the alma mater of head coach Adam Walsh. Walsh had coached the team to its 1945 Championship in Cleveland in his first year at the helm, but the 1946 season in Los Angeles would be his last. In addition, the team appears to have placed an emphasis upon drafting collegians from the Western United States, picking 9 players from western schools.

Regular season

Schedule

Standings

See also

 1946 NFL Championship Game

Footnotes

Further reading

 Charles Ross, Outside the Lines: African Americans and the Integration of the National Football League. New York: New York University Press, 2001.

External links
 Johnny Gomez, "1946: LA Bound," Rams Talk website, www.talkgridiron.com/

Los Angeles Rams
Los Angeles Rams seasons
Los Angeles